Rajnagar Mahavidyalaya, established in 2009, is an undergraduate general and honours degree college in Rajnagar, in Birbhum district. It offers undergraduate courses in arts. It is affiliated to  University of Burdwan.

See also

References

External links

Colleges affiliated to University of Burdwan
Educational institutions established in 2009
Universities and colleges in Birbhum district
2009 establishments in West Bengal